The Live Oak Society is a membership organization for mature live oak trees. It was founded in 1934 to advance the culture, distribution, preservation, and appreciation of the southern live oak (Quercus virginiana) and functions under the auspices of the Louisiana Garden Club Federation, Inc.  By 2013, more than 7,000 live oaks were registered with the Society.

History
Dr. Edwin Lewis Stephens, president of Southwestern Louisiana Institute (now University of Louisiana at Lafayette) from 1900 to 1938, founded the Live Oak Society in 1934. In 1957, responsibility for maintaining records and registering new applicants was assumed by the Louisiana Garden Club Federation, Inc. According to Society bylaws, the only human member permitted in the Society is the honorary chairman, who is responsible for registering and recording live oak members.

Features
In 2013, the Live Oak Society had 7,114 registered members dating from 1934, but many of the earliest registrants are labeled deceased. The live oak with the largest girth serves as President of the Society. The largest stand (group) of registered live oaks, consisting of more than 200 trees, is located in City Park (New Orleans).

Trees are registered by designated name, location, girth, and sponsor. The registry includes trees from 14 U.S. States.

See also

 National Register of Big Trees

References

External links

Organizations established in 1934
Non-profit organizations based in Louisiana
Horticultural organizations based in the United States